CDM Smith is an engineering and construction company headquartered in Boston, Massachusetts which offers services in water, environment, transportation, and energy and facilities projects for public and private clients. Major services include design, consulting and program management with a focus on emerging areas such as polyfluoroalkyl substances (PFAS), transportation advisory services, lead in drinking water and digital solutions. The employee owned company is currently ranked 23rd on Engineering News-Record's 2022 Top 500 Design Firms list and 22nd on their 2021 Top 200 Environmental Firms list.

History 
Camp Dresser & McKee (CDM) was founded in 1947 by Thomas Ringgold Camp with partners Herman Dresser and Jack McKee. Due to Camp’s background in sanitary engineering, the company initially focused on drinking water infrastructure programs in New England. In the 1960s when the firm started accepting contracts internationally in Colombia and Bangladesh, the firm grew to become a global engineering and construction firm. Through numerous acquisitions in the 1970s, as well as partnering with the U.S. EPA in 1973 and other federal agencies in 1985, CDM Smith expanded to offer services in clean water, hazardous waste and the environment, transportation, energy, and facilities sectors on a national and international scale. Today, the company has nearly 5,000 employees in 131 offices, with 85 offices being in the United States.  

In 2011, CDM acquired Wilbur Smith, a 1,000-employee transportation engineering firm to form CDM Smith. CDM Smith later acquired the Ohio-based Louis Perry Group in late 2014 as an independent subsidiary to expand its industrial expertise in the rubber and plastic industry. In 2015, CDM Smith moved its headquarters from a 180,000 square foot space at 50 Hampshire St, Cambridge, Massachusetts to a 120,000 sq ft office space at 75 State Street in Boston. In 2021, CDM Smith acquired Milestone Solutions, a North-America based firm specializing in road usage charging and pricing.

In January 2022, CDM Smith formed a new subsidiary, Trinnex, to offer digital services and software to U.S. municipal clients. Trinnex offers software as service products, including pipeCAST, leadCAST, epiCAST and precipiCAST for water, lead pipes, epidemics and weather tracking and insights. Their digital services include risk, performance, and capital planning; digital strategy and transformation; decision analytics and optimization; and digital twin design and development. Trinnex is headquartered in Manchester, New Hampshire, with nearly 50 employees distributed across the Unit

On June 21, 2017, the US Justice Department declined to prosecute CDM Smith for corruption, despite finding that the company had paid $1.18 million to officials in India. In July 2017, CDM Smith agreed to pay around $4 million to the US Treasury after which investigations by the Fraud Section of the Criminal Division of the Department of Justice into bribery were closed. CDM Smith has been sanctioned by the World Bank for “failing to disclose a subcontract on a project in Vietnam, and were conditionally non-de-barred for one and half years. On July 15, 2017, it was announced that the Goa government has asked state chief secretary Dharmendra Sharma to investigate bribes from CDM Smith in India.
Based on Special Investigation Team (SIT) of Central Vigilance Commission (India's anti-corruption watchdog), India's Central Bureau of Investigation (parallel to USA's FBI) filed first FIR in this case on February 2, 2018.

Principal subsidiaries 
CDM Smith's principal subsidiaries are:
CDM Constructors Inc.
CDM Federal Programs Corporation
CDM International Inc.
CDM Smith Consult GmbH (Germany)
CDM Smith Danismanlik ve Mühendislik Ltd. (Turkey)
CDM Smith Ireland Limited
CDM Smith Sp.z.o.o. (Poland)
The Louis Perry Group
Trinnex

Significant projects 
Houston Northeast Water Purification Plant expansion; a $1.8B progressive design-build project considered the largest of its kind 
Newark Lead Service Line Replacement Program; considered the "national model" for lead pipe replacement in the U.S.
Wadi Al Arab System II Water Conveyance Project; a $129.5M project to provide drinking water to the Kingdom of Jordan
COVID-19 Alternate Care Facility in Kalispell, MT; an emergency design & construction project to provide hospital capacity during the COVID-19 pandemic
MassDOT All-Electronic Tolling System; replacing all toll booths on the Massachusetts Turnpike with transponders
Water Purification Technology Program and R&D Testing Project in Jacksonville, FL; exploring an alternative water supply for the eighth-largest community-owned utility in the U.S.
TxDOT US 67 Corridor Master Plan; with outreach that included bilingual communications, mixed reality activities, online maps and tools, and extensive public meetings
Metolong Dam and Water Supply Program in Lesotho; providing potable water for more than 500,000 people in the region
All-Electric Bus Rapid Transit System, Indianapolis; considered the "next evolution" of bus rapid transit systems
DC Water Waste-to-Energy Project; a $470M project producing a net 10MW of electricity from the wastewater treatment process

References

Bibliography

 
 
 
 
 
 
 

Companies based in Boston
Organizations based in Boston
Engineering consulting firms of the United States
International engineering consulting firms